Willie Leon Manley (May 20, 1926 – March 13, 2010) was an American football player and coach. He was born in Hollis, Oklahoma. He lettered for three seasons as guard at the University of Oklahoma from 1947 to 1949.  He was selected in the 1950 NFL Draft by the Green Bay Packers and was on their roster in 1950 and 1951. Later from 1953 to '54 he played for the Edmonton Eskimos of the Western Interprovincial Football Union.  After his playing career was through Manley pursued a coaching career and was a longtime assistant under Darrell Royal at Texas, first as offensive line coach and later succeeding Don Breaux as offensive coordinator. Royal was Manley's childhood friend and later a high school and college teammate.

Manley died in March 2010 in Austin, Texas.

References

External links

1926 births
2010 deaths
American football offensive guards
American players of Canadian football
Colgate Raiders football coaches
Edmonton Elks players
Green Bay Packers players
Louisiana–Monroe Warhawks football coaches
Oklahoma Sooners football players
Texas Longhorns football coaches
Wyoming Cowboys football coaches
High school football coaches in Oklahoma
People from Hollis, Oklahoma
Players of American football from Oklahoma